Carnbo is a hamlet in Perth and Kinross, Scotland.

References

Villages in Perth and Kinross